Robert Bruce of Clackmannan was the son of Sir James Bruce and a direct descendant of Sir Thomas Bruce, 1st Baron of Clackmannan. Robert Bruce was a successful trader and he immigrated to the British Gold Coast in 1745. Bruce resided in the Ga city of Jamestown, Ghana.

Background
Robert Bruce was an elder son of Sir James Bruce and an unknown mother in 1715. His father left to establish a plantation in Barbados and later on married Keturah French.

Descendants
King Bruce- Ghanaian singer

Sources

House of Bruce
Robert W. July, An African Voice: The Role of the Humanities in African Independence, Duke University press, 1987, p. 132.
Robert W. July, The Origins of Modern African Thought: Its Development in West Africa During the Nineteenth and Twentieth Centuries (1967), Africa World Press, 2004, p. 258.
Seth Quartey, Carl Christian Reindorf: Colonial Subjectivity and Drawn Boundaries.
Annual Bibliography of British and Irish History, Oxford University Press, 1999.

Robert Bruce
Robert Bruce
History of Ghana
Scottish merchants
Scottish people of the British Empire
18th-century Scottish businesspeople